Dahandar or Dehendar or Dahan-e Dar may refer to:
 Dahan-e Dar, Senderk, Hormozgan Province
 Dahandar, Tukahur, Hormozgan Province
 Dahandar-e Kalak, Hormozgan Province
 Dahandar-e Mir Amr, Hormozgan Province
 Dehendar-e Shahbabak, Hormozgan Province
 Dahandar-e Shonbeh, Hormozgan Province
 Dahandar, Kerman